This is a list of programs broadcast by CH / E!, a television system in Canada that operated from 2001 to 2009.

Fall 2008 schedule
In prime time, they will continue to carry some programming purchased from the American conventional broadcast networks, but will otherwise air a very similar program schedule to the American E! network.

The last shows broadcast by E!

20/20
The Best Years
Dateline NBC
Deal or No Deal
Diva on a Dime
Doc
Extreme Makeover: Home Edition
Guiding Light
The Harley Show 
How I Met Your Mother
The Insider
The Loop
Monday Night Football (broadcast time unknown)
My Boys
Psych
Running In Heels
Stargate SG-1
Talkshow with Spike Feresten
WWE Friday Night SmackDown (Montreal only)

Formerly broadcast

60 Minutes (2001-2007)
24
10 Items or Less
Creature Comforts
dark angel (2001)
century city
Crossing Jordan
Help Me Help You
The King of Queens
Las Vegas
leap of faith (2002)
NCIS (moved to Global)
One Tree Hill
k-ville (2007)
Raines (2007)
Ramona (1988 TV series)
Stacked
Surface (2005-2006)
Touched by an Angel
Technical Knockout
Two and a Half Men (2003-2007)
 Viva Laughlin    - cancelled
the Guardian

Came into 2008-2009 season

24
Boston Legal
Do Not Disturb
Knight Rider
My Name is Earl
Secret Millionaire
Worst Week

See also
List of Canadian television series

E! Canada
E